Anjarak or Anjerk may refer to:
 Anjarak, Isfahan
 Anjarak, Kerman